Christopher Brennan (born 1832, date of death unknown) was a Union Navy sailor in the American Civil War and a recipient of the U.S. military's highest decoration, the Medal of Honor, for his actions at the Battle of Forts Jackson and St. Philip.

Biography
Born in 1832 in Ireland, Brennan joined the US Navy from Boston, Massachusetts in May 1861. His commanding officer stated that he "was the life and soul of the gun's crew." For this action, he was awarded the Medal of Honor a year later on July 10, 1863. Brennan re-enlisted twice more, and was promoted to Acting Master's Mate in November 1863. He deserted from the Navy in August 1864, and the remainder of his life is unknown.

Brennan's official Medal of Honor citation reads:
On board the U.S.S. Mississippi during attacks on Forts Jackson and St. Philip and during the taking of New Orleans, 24–25 April 1862. Taking part in the actions which resulted in the damaging of the Mississippi and several casualties on it, Brennan showed skill and courage throughout the entire engagements which resulted in the taking of St. Philip and Jackson and in the surrender of New Orleans.

See also

List of American Civil War Medal of Honor recipients: A-F

References 

1832 births
Year of death unknown
Irish emigrants to the United States (before 1923)
Irish sailors in the United States Navy
People of Massachusetts in the American Civil War
Union Navy sailors
Irish-born Medal of Honor recipients
United States Navy Medal of Honor recipients
American Civil War recipients of the Medal of Honor